Brookula lamonti is a species of sea snail, a marine gastropod mollusk, unassigned in the superfamily Seguenzioidea.

Description
The shell reaches a height of 1.6 mm.

Distribution
This marine species occurs off the South Georgia Islands.

References

External links
 To Encyclopedia of Life
 To World Register of Marine Species

lamonti
Gastropods described in 1961